The Petite rivière Niagarette (English: Little Niagarette River) is a tributary of the Niagarette River, crossing the municipalities of Saint-Thuribe and Saint-Casimir, in the Portneuf Regional County Municipality, in the administrative region of Capitale-Nationale, in Quebec, in Canada.

The surface of the Petite Niagarette River (except the rapids zones) is generally frozen from the beginning of December to the end of March, but the safe circulation on the ice is generally made from the end of December to the beginning of March.

Geography 
This source is located in a forest area at:
 west of the summit of "La Montagne";
 southwest of the center of the village of Saint-Thuribe;
 south-east of the village center of Saint-Ubalde;
 north-west of the confluence of the Petite Rivière Niagarette and the Niagarette River.

 generally south-east on the west side of "La Montagne" up to the limit between the forest area and the agricultural area;
 eastwards in the agricultural area, up to the railway bridge;
 to the east in an agricultural zone by crossing route 363 (boulevard de la Montagne), forming a hook towards the south, to its mouth.

The Little Niagarette River flows on the west bank of the Niagarette River, on the west side of the center of the village of Saint-Casimir.

History 
Two major floods have been reported in the history of the Niagarette River and the Little Niagarette River, in 1939 and in 1973. The waters of the Little Niagarette River rose by almost 4 meters during the night of September 5 to 6, 1973, following a 6 cm rain accumulation.

Toponymy 
The toponyms "Little Niagarette River" and "Niagarette River" are linked.

The toponym "Petite rivière Niagarette" was formalized on August 17, 1978, at the Place Names Bank of the Commission de toponymie du Québec.

See also 
 List of rivers of Quebec

References

Bibliography

External links 
 

Rivers of Capitale-Nationale